Pilcher Peak is a peak between Mouillard and Lilienthal Glaciers, on the west coast of Graham Land. Photographed by the Falkland Islands and Dependencies Aerial Survey Expedition (FIDASE) in 1956–57, and mapped from these photos by the Falkland Islands Dependencies Survey (FIDS). Named by the United Kingdom Antarctic Place-Names Committee (UK-APC) in 1960 for Percy Pilcher (1866–1899), British engineer and pioneer of gliding flight.

Mountains of Graham Land
Danco Coast